The hoop snake is a legendary creature of the United States, Canada, and Australia. It appears in the Pecos Bill stories; although his description of hoop snakes is the one with which people are most familiar, stories of the creature predate those fictional tales considerably. Several sightings of the hoop snake have been alleged along the Minnesota-Wisconsin border in the St. Croix River valley (Recently Hudson, Wisconsin), Wake County in North Carolina, Prince Edward Island, and Kamloops, British Columbia.

In folklore 
According to folklore, the distinguishing feature of a hoop snake is that it can grasp its tail in its jaws and roll after its prey like a wheel; which is similar to the ouroboros in Greek mythology or the tsuchinoko in Japan. In one version of the myth, the snake straightens out at the last second, skewering its victim with its venomous tail. The only escape is to hide behind a tree, which receives the deadly blow instead and promptly dies from the poison.

The hoop snake is mentioned in a letter from 1784 (published in Tour in the U.S.A., Vol. I, p. 263-65. London):

Sightings 
Purported sightings are still occasionally reported, though the existence of the hoop snake has never been accepted by the scientific community. Naturalist Raymond Ditmars placed $10,000 in trust at a New York bank for the first person to provide evidence of a hoop snake. Some have suggested it is a distorted description of the sidewinder of the American Southwest, or of mud snakes, which will occasionally lie in a loose hoop shape. The hoop snake possibly is an embellishment of actual instances of snakes swallowing their own tails, mistaking them for prey.

See also
Amphisbaena
Fearsome critters
Joint snake
Ouroboros 
Rotating locomotion in living systems
Serpent (symbolism)
 Snow snake

References

Fearsome critters
Fictional snakes
Legendary serpents
Australian legendary creatures
Pecos Bill